Sermons to Young Women (1766), often called Fordyce's Sermons, is a two-volume compendium of sermons compiled by James Fordyce, a Scottish clergyman, which were originally delivered by himself and others. Fordyce was considered an excellent orator, and his collection of sermons found a ready audience among English clergy and laity alike. It quickly became a staple of many Church and personal libraries.

References in other works 
In the novel Pride and Prejudice by Jane Austen, Mr Collins, a clergyman, attempts to read the book aloud to the women during a visit to the Bennet household. The youngest of the five Bennet daughters, Lydia, interrupts him "before . . . three pages" leading him to stop reading, with the comment, "how little young ladies are interested by books of a serious stamp, though written solely for their benefit. It amazes me, I confess;—for certainly, there can be nothing so advantageous to them as instruction."

Additionally in the 1775 play The Rivals, by Richard Brinsley Sheridan, Fordyce's sermon on Sobriety is mentioned.

References

External links
 Sermons to Young Women – Internet Archive

Christian sermons
1766 books